William Lucy was an English bishop.

William Lucy may also refer to:

William Lucy (labor leader)
William Henry Lucy, journalist
William Lucy (MP) for Warwickshire (UK Parliament constituency)
William Lucy (died 1873), owner of Lucy's Eagle Ironworks
Sir William Lucy, Sheriff of Warwickshire in 1445, and a character in Henry VI, Part 1

See also
 William Lucy Way, Oxford, England